The Flag of Indonesia is a simple bicolor with two horizontal bands, red (top) and white (bottom) with an overall ratio of 2:3. It was introduced and hoisted in public during the proclamation of independence on 17 August 1945 at 56 Proklamasi Street (formerly Pegangsaan Timur Street) in Jakarta, and again when the Dutch formally transferred sovereignty on 27 December 1949. The design of the flag has remained unchanged since.

The flag of Indonesia is graphically similar to the flag of Monaco, with a slight difference in the shade of red, and ratio of its dimensions. The flag of Poland has similar dimensions but has the colours reversed: white on top and red on the bottom. In both, the red is of a slightly darker shade.

The "Naval Jack of Indonesia" is reserved for sole use by the Indonesian Navy. It flies from the jackstaff of every active Indonesian warship while anchored or moored pierside and on special occasions. The design of the jack is described as nine alternating stripes, consisted of five red and four white stripes. It is nicknamed Sang Saka Merah Putih, . The naval jack dates to the age of Majapahit Empire. This empire, renowned for its great maritime strength, flew similar jacks on its vessels.

History 
 

The flag's colours are derived from the banner of the 13th century Majapahit Empire. However, it has been suggested that the red and white symbolism can trace its origin to the older common Austronesian mythology of the duality of Mother Earth (red) and Father Sky (white). This is why these colours appear in so many flags throughout Austronesia, from Tahiti to Madagascar. The earliest records of the red and white panji or pataka (a long flag on a curved bamboo pole) can be found in the Pararaton chronicle; according to this source, the Jayakatwang troops from Gelang-Gelang hoisted the red and white banner during their invasion of Singhasari in the early 12th century. This suggests that even before the Majapahit era, the red and white colours were already revered and used as the kingdom's banner in the Kediri era (1042 – c. 1222).

Red and white textile colouring was available in ancient Indonesia. White is the natural colour of woven cotton fabrics, while red is one of the earliest natural dyes, acquired either from teak leaves, the flowers of Averrhoa bilimbi, or the skin of mangosteen fruits.

It was not only the Javanese kingdoms that used red and white. The battle flag of King Sisingamangaraja IX of Batak lands bore an image of white twin swords called piso gaja dompak against a red background. During the Aceh War of 1873–1904, Aceh warriors used a battle flag with the image of a sword, star and crescent, sun, and some Quranic script in white on a red background. The red and white flag of the Buginese Bone kingdom in South Sulawesi is called Woromporang. The Balinese Badung (Puri Pamecutan) royal banner is red, white, and black. During the Java War (1825–1830) Prince Diponegoro also used a red and white banner.

In the early 20th century these colours were revived by students and then nationalists, as an expression of nationalism against the Dutch. The modern red and white flag which was first flown in Java in 1928, was prohibited under Dutch rule. It became the flag adopted by the Kesatuan Melayu Muda to symbolise Malay nationalism against European colonialism. Upon Indonesia's declaration of independence on 17 August 1945 it was adopted as the national flag, and has been in use ever since. After Indonesia's independence was recognized, Monaco, which had a similar flag, filed a complaint which was largely ignored.

Hotel Yamato incident

The flag featured in a well-known incident during the Indonesian War of Independence when  during the lead-up to the Battle of Surabaya in late 1945, Indonesian youths removed a colonial Dutch flag flying over the Yamato Hotel, tore off the blue strip and re-hoisted it as an Indonesian flag. The hotel was subsequently renamed briefly as Hotel Merdeka, meaning "independence hotel".

Name
The official name of the flag is Sang Saka Merah-Putih (meaning "lofty bicolour Red and White") according to Article 35 of the 1945 Constitution. The flag is commonly called Bendera Merah-Putih (Red-and-White Flag). Occasionally, it is also called Sang Dwiwarna (The bicolour).
Sang Saka Merah-Putih (The Lofty Red-and-White) refers to the historical flag called Bendera Pusaka (heirloom flag) and its replica. The Bendera Pusaka is the flag that was flown in front of Sukarno's house after he proclaimed Indonesia's independence on 17 August 1945. The original Bendera Pusaka was sewn by Fatmawati, and was hoisted every year in front of the Merdeka Palace during the independence day ceremony. It was hoisted for the last time on 17 August 1968. Since then it has been preserved and replaced by a replica since the original flag was deemed to be too fragile.

Symbolism
Several opinions have been expressed on the meaning of the red and white in the Indonesian flag. One of them is that the red stands for courage, while the white stands for purity. Another opinion is that red represents the human body or physical life, while white represents the soul or spiritual life; together they stand for a complete human being.''

As Sukarno said:

The colours are the same as those used in the flag of the Majapahit.

Colours

Usage

Regulation and flag protocol

The flag is described in Article 35, Chapter XV, of the Constitution of Indonesia; Government Regulation No. 24/2009; and Government Regulation No. 40/1958.

The raising of the flag should be conducted in the time between sunrise until sunset, but in certain circumstances, it can be done at night. In daily use, the flag should be flown at every commemoration such as Indonesian Independence Day on 17 August every year, by the citizens who have a right to use it at house, building or office, schools, colleges, public and private transport and the representative office of Indonesia in overseas.

It can be used as the cover of the coffin of a President or former Presidents, Vice President or former Vice Presidents, Members of Cabinet, Speaker of People's Representative Council, and Head of Government, members of the Indonesian Armed Forces, and persons who are members of the Indonesian National Police who died in service, or an Indonesian citizen who made contributions to their nation as a badge of honor.

The flag must be displayed everyday in places such as the Presidential Palace, government and private office buildings, border posts and outer islands in the territory of Indonesia, and the National Heroes Cemetery.

The flag should be displayed everywhere on special days, which are:

2 May: National Education Day.
20 May: National Awakening Day.
1 June: Day of the Birth of Pancasila.
17 August: Indonesia Independence Day.
28 October: Youth Pledge Day.
10 November: Heroes Day.

Half-mast

The flag should be displayed at half-mast as a sign of mourning on these days:

26 December, in remembrance of victims of the 2004 Indian Ocean earthquake and tsunami.
Three days after the death of President or former Presidents, Vice President or former Vice Presidents, Members of Cabinet, Speaker of People's Representative Council, and Head of Government.
Other mourning days established by the government.

Usually, the Indonesian flag is also flown at half-mast on 30 September, in remembrance of the 30 September Movement, but after the New Order ended in 1998, this tradition stopped. However, this tradition is restarted in recent days.

Prohibited acts
Based on Law No. 24/2009, all citizens are prohibited from:
destroying, tearing, trampling, burning, or performing other actions with the intention to tarnish, insult, or degrade the honour of the national flag;
using the national flag for billboards or commercials;
flying the national flag if it is torn, smudged, crumpled, or faded;
printing on, embroidering or adding letters, numbers, images or other signs, or adding badges or any objects to the national flag;
using the national flag to cover a ceiling or roof, or for wrapping or covering goods in a way that can degrade the honour of the national flag.

See also 

 List of flags of Indonesia
 Flags of the United States of Indonesia
 Armorial of Indonesia
 Flag of Indonesia size guidelines

References

External links

 

National symbols of Indonesia
Flags of Indonesia
Indonesia
Indonesia
Indonesia